Piracy in the 21st century (commonly known as modern piracy) has taken place in a number of waters around the world, including the Gulf of Guinea, Strait of Malacca, Sulu and Celebes Seas, Indian Ocean, and Falcon Lake.

Waters

Caribbean 

Due to the crisis in Bolivarian Venezuela, issues of piracy returned to the Caribbean in the 2010s, with the increase of pirates being compared to piracy off the coast of Somalia due to the similar socioeconomic origins. In 2016, former fishermen became pirates, appearing in the state of Sucre, with attacks happening  daily and multiple killings occurring. By 2018 as Venezuelans became more desperate, fears arose that Venezuelan pirates would spread throughout Caribbean waters.

Falcon Lake

Piracy on Falcon Lake involves crime at the border between the United States and Mexico on Falcon Lake. The lake is a  reservoir constructed in 1954 and is a known drug smuggling route.

A turf war between rival drug cartels for control of the lake began in March 2010 and has led to a series of armed robberies and shooting incidents. All of the attacks were credited to the Los Zetas cartel and occurred primarily on the Mexican side of the reservoir but within sight of the Texas coast. The so-called pirates operate "fleets" of small boats designed to seize fishermen and smuggle drugs.

While the events have been referred to colloquially as piracy, all the waters of Falcon Lake are considered either US or Mexican territorial waters and therefore are not technically piracy under Article 101 of the UN Convention on the Law of the Sea.

Gulf of Guinea

Piracy in the Gulf of Guinea affects a number of countries in West Africa as well as the wider international community.  By 2011, it had become an issue of global concern. Pirates in the Gulf of Guinea are often part of heavily armed criminal enterprises, who employ violent methods to steal oil cargo. In 2012, the International Maritime Bureau, Oceans Beyond Piracy and the Maritime Piracy Humanitarian Response Program reported that the number of vessels attacks by West African pirates had reached a world high, with 966 seafarers attacked during the year.

Piracy in the Gulf of Guinea has evolved over the first decade of the century. For some time, smaller ships shuttling employees and materials belonging to the oil companies with any involvement in oil exploration had been at risk in Nigeria. Over time, pirates became more aggressive and better armed. As of 2014, pirate attacks in West Africa mainly occur in territorial waters, terminals and harbours rather than in the high seas. This incident pattern has hindered intervention by international naval forces. Pirates in the region operate a well-funded criminal industry, which includes established supply networks. They are often part of heavily armed and sophisticated criminal enterprises, who increasingly use motherships to launch their attacks. The local pirates' overall aim is to steal oil cargo. As such, they do not attach much importance to holding crew members and non-oil cargo and vessels for ransom. Additionally, pirates in the Gulf of Guinea are especially noted for their violent modus operandi, which frequently involves the kidnapping, torture and shooting of crewmen. The increasingly violent methods used by these groups is believed to be part of a conscious "business model" adopted by them, in which violence and intimidation plays a major role.

By 2010, 45 and by 2012 120 incidents were reported to the UN International Maritime Organization. However, many events go unreported. Piracy acts interfere with the legitimate trading interests of the affected countries that include Benin, Togo, Côte d’Ivoire, Ghana, Nigeria, and the Democratic Republic of Congo. As an example, trade of Benin's major port, the Port of Cotonou, was reported in 2012 to have dropped by 70 percent. The cost of piracy in the Gulf of Guinea due to stolen goods, security, and insurance has been estimated to be about $2 billion. According to the Control Risks Group, pirate attacks in the Gulf of Guinea had by mid-November 2013 maintained a steady level of around 100 attempted hijackings in the year, a close third behind Southeast Asia.

Indian Ocean

Piracy in the Indian Ocean has been a threat to international shipping since the beginning of the Somali Civil War in the early 1990s. Since 2005, many international organizations have expressed concern over the rise in acts of piracy. Piracy impeded the delivery of shipments and increased shipping expenses, costing an estimated $6.6 to $6.9 billion a year in global trade according to Oceans Beyond Piracy (OBP). According to the German Institute for Economic Research (DIW), a veritable industry of profiteers also arose around the piracy. Insurance companies significantly increased their profits from the pirate attacks as insurance companies hiked rate premiums in response.

Combined Task Force 150, a multinational coalition task force, took on the role of fighting the piracy by establishing a Maritime Security Patrol Area (MSPA) within the Gulf of Aden and Guardafui Channel. By September 2012, the heyday of piracy in the Indian Ocean was reportedly over. According to the International Maritime Bureau, pirate attacks had by October 2012 dropped to a six-year low, with only one ship attacked in the third quarter compared to thirty-six during the same period in 2011. By December 2013, the US Office of Naval Intelligence reported that only 9 vessels had been attacked during the year by the pirates, with zero successful hijackings. Control Risks attributed this 90% decline in pirate activity from the corresponding period in 2012 to the adoption of best management practices by vessel owners and crews, armed private security on board ships, a significant naval presence, and the development of onshore security forces.

Strait of Malacca

Pirates in the Strait of Malacca near Indonesia are normally armed with guns, knives, or machetes. The pirates in this area also attack ships during the night. If vessels sound an alarm, the pirates usually leave without confronting the crew. Pirates in the Singapore Straits attack at night, while ships are underway or anchored.

According to the Control Risks Group, pirate attacks in the Strait of Malacca had by mid-November 2013 reached a world high, surpassing those in the Gulf of Guinea.

Sulu and Celebes Seas

The Sulu and Celebes Seas, a semi- enclosed sea area and porous region that covers an area of space around 1 million square kilometres, have been subject to illegal maritime activities since the pre-colonial era and continue to pose a maritime security threat to bordering nations up to this day. Recently, the abduction of crew members is the most common illicist activity, with most of the incidents being ascribed to the violent extremist group Abu Sayyaf. Since March 2016, the Information Sharing Centre (ISC) of the Regional Cooperation Agreement on Combating Piracy and Armed Robbery against Ships in Asia (ReCAAP) reports a total of 86 abuctions, leading to the issue of a warning for ships transpassing the area.

Notable occurrences

See also
Piracy in the Caribbean
Piracy in the Persian Gulf
Piracy in the British Virgin Islands 
Piracy in the Strait of Malacca
The Dark Pictures Anthology: Man of Medan

References

External links
 Live Piracy Map. Recent piracy incidents listed by the Piracy Reporting Centre of the International Maritime Bureau.

21st century
21st century